Counterfeiters is a 2017 American action film, directed, produced, written by, and starring Bryce Hirschberg. Counterfeiters (based on his short film by the same name), tells the story of a young man, Bridger, who creates a "do-it-yourself" method of counterfeiting money to save his dying mother. It is notable for being filmed almost entirely on a boat in Marina del Rey, California on a shoe-string budget.

Plot 

Recent college graduate and hard-working kid, Bridger (Bryce Hirschberg), receives heartbreaking news that his mother has cancer. Strapped for cash, he needs to make more money than his day job pays to provide his mother with treatment. As fate would have it, he finds a half bleached dollar bill in his pocket after pulling his clothes out of the wash. This spurs an idea on how to 'make' a ton of money. BUT he would only focus on counterfeiting 'small' bills, 5s, 10s, 20s, because 'who checks a $10?'. After bringing his close friends in on the scheme, they begin to abuse the process, which puts Bridger, and his mother, at risk. And a sting involving one of his best friends turns deadly.

Cast 
 Bryce Hirschberg as Bridger
 Robert McEveety as Rob
 Taylor Lookwood as Preston
 Noel Castellanos as Jose
 Shawn Rolph as Jimmy
 Bridget Avildsen as Genise
 Nick Huebner as Alvin
 Peyton Pritchard as Amber

Release 
The film was completed in July 2017 and had its world premiere at the Action On Film International Film Festival in Las Vegas, Nevada at the Brenden Theatre in the Palms Casino Resort. It has since been screened at several major film festivals around the world including; the Wolves Independent International Film Festival (Lithuania), Miami Independent Film Festival (United States), Wales International Film Festival (United Kingdom), Marina del Rey Film Festival (United States), Oniros Film Awards (Italy), and Filmchella (United States).

The film was released on iTunes and Amazon Prime by GoDigital on February 6, 2018, before being released theatrically in a limited release on June 15, 2018.

Reception 
Counterfeiters received positive reviews from critics. On review aggregator Rotten Tomatoes, the film holds an approval rating of 67% based on 6 reviews. Alex Arabian of Film Inquiry praised Hirschberg, "This is the work of a talented filmmaker just beginning his creative endeavors in the industry. By combining realism with some of his favorite cinematic influences, maximizing an impressively minimal budget, and embracing the art of collaboration, Hirschberg makes a commendable film debut with Counterfeiters." Katie Walsh of the Los Angeles Times commented, "...the ambition and moments of inspired style are [to] be lauded."

Awards

References

External links 
 

2017 films
American action films
Counterfeit money in film
2017 action films
2010s English-language films
2010s American films